Lee Bodimeade (born 12 February 1970 in Warwick, Queensland) is a former field hockey player from Australia, who was part of the team that won the silver medal at the 1992 Summer Olympics in Barcelona, Spain.

A member of Australia's men's national team from 1991 to 1998, Bodimeade also won the bronze medal at the 1994 Men's Hockey World Cup in Sydney, and earned a pair of medals in Champions Trophy competitions, including a silver medal in 1992 and a gold medal in 1993.

In 2005, Bodimeade was named head coach of the U.S. women's national team.

He was honored as USA Field Hockey's 2006 National Coach of the Year.

References

External links
 
 Profile on AOC-site

1970 births
Australian male field hockey players
Australian field hockey coaches
Olympic field hockey players of Australia
Field hockey players at the 1992 Summer Olympics
Living people
People from Warwick, Queensland
Olympic silver medalists for Australia
Olympic medalists in field hockey
Medalists at the 1992 Summer Olympics
American Olympic coaches